Measurements Halt railway station was opened on 18 July 1932 as part of the former London and North Western Railway route from Oldham to Delph. The station closed on 2 May 1955, when the Delph Donkey passenger train service to Delph via Greenfield was withdrawn. It served the Measurements factory and only one train in each direction called at the station per day.

While the line past the station site was opened by the LNWR in 1851, by the time Measurements Halt opened in 1932, the LNWR had already merged with other companies to form the London, Midland and Scottish Railway and that company is credited with opening the station - the only station on the Delph Donkey Line opened after the LNWR became defunct.

References

Disused railway stations in the Metropolitan Borough of Oldham
Former London, Midland and Scottish Railway stations
Railway stations in Great Britain opened in 1932
Railway stations in Great Britain closed in 1955
Saddleworth